Ladhar Bheinn is the highest mountain in the Knoydart region of the Highlands of Scotland. It is the most westerly Munro on the Scottish mainland.

The mountain may be climbed from Barrisdale to the northeast or Inverie to the south. From Barrisdale the mountain may be climbed as part of circuit of Coire Dhorrcaill; this route involves a certain amount of scrambling, particularly on the section immediately north of the subsidiary summit of Stob a Chearcaill.

References

 This list gives information about map, grid ref and neighbours

Munros
Marilyns of Scotland
Mountains and hills of the Northwest Highlands
One-thousanders of Scotland